Interceptor may refer to:

Vehicles

 Interceptor aircraft (or simply "interceptor"), a type of point defense fighter aircraft designed specifically to intercept and destroy enemy aircraft
 Ford Crown Victoria Police Interceptor, a police car
 Ford Interceptor, a 2007 concept car built on a stretched version of the Ford D2C platform
 Interceptor 400, a civilian aircraft marque
 USCG Long Range Interceptor, a fast small watercraft
 Jensen Interceptor, an automobile marque
 Honda Interceptor, a motorcycle
 Royal Enfield Interceptor, a motorcycle

Plumbing and civil engineering
 Interceptor drain, a type of French drain often used in storm sewer systems
 Interceptor sewer, in urban sewerage systems, a large pipe transporting sewage from local trunk sewers to a sewage treatment plant
 Grease interceptor, another term for a grease trap

Popular culture

Film and television 
 The Interceptor, a British drama series on BBC One
 Interceptor (TV series), a British television game show that ran during 1989
 Interceptor (film), a 2022 film starring Elsa Pataky and Luke Bracey
 "Angel Interceptor", a 1977 aircraft piloted by the Angels in the original Captain Scarlet and the Mysterons and the Falcon Interceptor as piloted by the Angels in Gerry Anderson's New Captain Scarlet
 A type of near-Earth spacecraft in UFO (TV series)#SHADO equipment
 "Pursuit Special" (AKA "V8 Interceptor"), an iconic muscle car in the Mad Max franchise
 Turbo Interceptor, fictional car in the 1986 film The Wraith, Interceptor also being the German title of the film
 HMS Interceptor, a Royal Navy warship from the 2003 film Pirates of the Caribbean: The Curse of the Black Pearl

Video games
 In computer gaming, spaceships with a similar purpose to interceptor aircraft or spacecraft, such as ...
 TIE Interceptor
 Interceptor, a 1976 video game by Taito
 F/A-18 Interceptor, a 1988 Amiga game by Electronic Arts
 X-COM: Interceptor, a 1998 flight-sim/tactical strategy game from the X-COM series

Other

 Interceptor Body Armor, an advanced form of combat protection currently fielded by the United States military
 Interceptor Corporation
 Interceptor missile, a type of defensive missile used against other missiles in flight
 Interceptor pattern used in software design, and in aspect-oriented programming
 Interceptor Micros, a former Amstrad CPC, Commodore 64 and ZX Spectrum video game developer
 Milbemycin oxime (trade name Interceptor), a heartworm preventative veterinary medication marketed by Novartis

See also

Intercept (disambiguation)
Interception (disambiguation)
Police Interceptor (disambiguation)